Phtheochroa syrtana is a species of moth of the family Tortricidae. It is found in north-western Africa (Tunisia and Algeria), Spain and Iran.

The wingspan is 14–16 mm. Adults have been recorded on wing from October to November.

References

Moths described in 1888
Phtheochroa